Indonesia sent a delegation to compete at the 1980 Summer Paralympics in Arnhem, Netherlands. Its athletes finished twenty eighth in the overall medal count.

Medalists

See also
 1980 Paralympic Games
 1980 Olympic Games
 Indonesia at the Paralympics
 Indonesia at the Olympics

References 

Nations at the 1980 Summer Paralympics
1980
Summer Paralympics